The 1967 European U19 Championship was an unofficial playing of the IIHF European U19 Championships. The tournament was held in Yaroslavl, Soviet Union from March 15–24, 1967. The official championships started in 1968.

Group A

Group B

Final round

References
1967 tournament on hockeyarchives.info

Junior
IIHF European Junior Championship tournament
International ice hockey competitions hosted by the Soviet Union
Junior
Sport in Yaroslavl
1967 in Russia
March 1967 sports events in Europe